What Can We Say? is the 1991 debut album of New Zealand hip hop duo MC OJ and Rhythm Slave.  It includes the singles "That's The Way (Positivity)" and "Money Worries", which charted at #12 and #36 respectively.

The album was written and produced in collaboration with George Hubbard and Daniel Barnes (Rhythm and Business) and Paul Casserly and Mark Tierney (Strawpeople).

Track listing

References 

Slave & Otis albums
1991 albums